The 1997 FIA GT Nürburgring 4 Hours was the fourth automobile endurance motor race for LMGT cars of the 1997 FIA GT Championship.  It was run at the Nürburgring, Germany on June 29, 1997.

Official results
Class winners in bold.  Cars failing to complete 75% of winner's distance marked as Not Classified (NC).

Statistics
 Pole Position – Bernd Schneider (#11 AMG-Mercedes) – 1:31.488
 Fastest Lap – Bernd Schneider (#11 AMG-Mercedes) – 1:33.614
 Distance – 667.674 km
 Average Speed – 166.785 km/h

References

External links
 World Sports Prototype Racing – Race Results

N
Nurburgring 4 Hours